Moses Anthony Nadar popularly known as Mosa Walsalam Sastriyar (1847 - 20 February 1916) was an Indian philosopher, social reformer, poet and Christian theologian. Moses is well known for his composition of Christian hymns through which he motivated backward people against caste discrimination and exploitation.

Moses was born into a Nadar Christian family in Thirupuram near Thiruvananthapuram. He was a multifaceted personality, a poet, a lyricist, a musician, an orator, a linguist and a Christian theologian. Moses was well versed in various languages and had authored literary works in Malayalam as well as Sanskrit. He was the first person to use Carnatic music for Christian hymns.

He was bestowed the title "Shasthri" (scholar) by the Mar Dionysus Metropolitan of Malankara Orthodox Church in 1883 after listening to his music and discourse.

Biography

Mosa Walsalam was born in 1847 at Thirupuram, near Neyyatinkara in Thiruvananthapuram (Trivandrum) district of present-day Kerala state.

His father Anthony aka Arulanandam was born as a Roman Catholic who was happened to be motivated by John Cox, a European missionary who worked under the London Missionary Society in southern Travancore. Anthony joined Protestant church and became a full-time evangelist in 1837. His son was christened "Mosa" (Moses) by Cox. The name was chosen after Moses the prophet, the hero of the Old Testament, who delivered the Israelites from slavery in Egypt. Young Moses Anthony was nicknamed as Walsalam (the beloved one) by John Cox.

Moses received education at his home village till the age of 15. After this, he proceeded to Nagercoil (presently in Kanyakumari District of Tamil Nadu) where he received training in Christian theology. For sometime, he was engaged in missionary activities and associated himself with the London Missionaries Society (L.M.S.). In the meantime, he acquired knowledge in Malayalam, Tamil, Sanskrit, English, Greek and Hebrew languages.

On completion of his theological studies, Mosa Walsalam was appointed a teacher at the Seminary run by the Church Mission Society (C.M.S.) in Kottayam, Kerala. Afterwards, he became a teacher at the L.M.S. School near Neyyattinkara.

In 1868, he got married. The name of his wife was Rahel. Six daughters and four sons were born of this wedlock.

Later, he was appointed a church worker in L.M.S Church at Kattakada (presently, Church of South India, Kattakada). During his stay at Kattakada (1891–96), he organised the activities of the backward caste people who were recent converts to Christianity. During this time, his youngest son died of snake bite. For his funeral, Mosa Walsalam sang the song "Ninte hitham poleyenne" ("Lead me according to Thy will". This proved to be the most popular song composed by him.

Mosa Walsalam was a well known poet and a great musician. He wrote many Christian songs in Malayalam and translated songs from Tamil and English to Malayalam. He was also a social reformer. He stressed on eradication caste-based inequalities and feudalism. Also, he gave much importance to creating awareness against liquor and toddy among the Christians of southern Travancore. He exhorted members of the Nadar Caste-to which he belonged- to give up tapping toddy from country palm, which was followed as a traditional profession by some of this caste members. Besides, he shared an intimate friendship with Sri Narayana Guru, the famous social reformer of Kerala, with whom he held many discussions on social and spiritual issues  at the latter's Aashrama in Pettah, Trivandrum.

Mosa Walsalam used to handle many musical instruments with proficiency. His knowledge in classical Carnatic music impressed everybody. He also had knowledge in classical western music and Hindustani music, as is revealed from his compositions. His lyrics and hymns are being used in Sunday 
services by the Church of South India and the Malankara Marthoma Suriyani Church all over Kerala. He was also an excellent painter. The most importantbooks of Mosa Walsalam include Dhyana Malika, Geetha Manjari, Christu Charitham, Mosa Natakam, etc. Impressed by his knowledge and talents, Mar Dionysius, the Presiding Bishop of the Malankara orthodox  Church bestowed him the title "Shasthri".

Soon, his fame spread far and wide. Sri Moolam Thirunal, the Maharaja of Travancore wished to hear him singing, and thus, he was summoned to the Travancore court. The Maharaja of the country listened to his music for more than an hour, with interest and curiosity. Then onwards, he is known as " the Singer of the Royal Court".

Works

Before Mosa Walsalam, there existed only a few Christian devotional songs in Malayalam, except some translations from the liturgical books of Syriac-based churches in Kerala and a few compositions by the western missionaries. The compositions of Mosa Walsalam gave a break from the above songs and he inaugurated the era of Malayalam Christian songs using Indian images and milieu. For the first time, Carnatic music was used in church choir in Kerala, which made the natives easier to identify themselves with the culture of their land. Most of the Sanskrit terms he used in his lyrics were either derived or borrowed from the Hindu concepts.

He has to his credit a large number of literary and musical works.A few of them were published during his lifetime itself. They include "Gitamanjari-Garland of Songs" (1903) and "Dhyanamalika-Meditation Songs " (1916). Later on "The collected works of Valsala Shasthriar" was brought out by Mr.J.John, his grandson, in 1958.

Copies of the works published in 1908 and 1916 were brought to light by Dr. (Miss) Pushpita John, former Head of Dept. of Education and Dean, Faculty of Education, University of Kerala, a descendant of Shastriar.
'Gita Manjari" testifies Valsala Shasthriar's in-depth knowledge of Carnatic music. Some of them have the "Chitta Swaras" attached to them. Only a person having real expertise in classical music can produce such compositions. "Cholkottu" like those in the compositions of Deekshithar and Swathi Thirunal have been attempted in some compositions, "Kaithukki Parane" in "Saveri-Rupakam, " Ananda Kirtaname" in Shankarabharanam-Rupakam contain this embellishment.
The first composition is presented as a 'Chithrapadyam'- a matrix of letters arranged meticulously to generate the poem ("Neethithakaya" in Thodi). The swara notations are unfortunately not included. Even some of the raga and tala specifications seem to be confusing. "Bandhu Varadi" is possibly "Pantu Varali". In some compositions, raga is specified as 'English'. These compositions are probably set to Shankarabharanam and meant to be sung in the Western style. This, perhaps, is an indication that only songs specified as 'English' are meant to be sung in the Western style and the others are pure Carnatic classical compositions.

The compositions of Sastriyar can be divided into two; his original scores in the Carnatic style and translations from western hymns and lyrics. These are meant as songs of worship in churches of southern Travancore (Kollam, Trivandrum and Kanyakumari districts) in an age when such songs were rare in Malayalam. His songs are still used in worship by the Church of South India (CSI) and the Marthoma churches. The songs translated by him from English will help us have a feeling of the original, as the translation has been carried out without compromising the meaning even while maintaining the poetic qualities. His original compositions would also make one appreciate his poetic talents by the subtlety he has shown in choosing the Sanskrit, Tamil and pure Malayalam words. He was a communicant member of the Mateer Memorial Church, LMS Compound, Triuvananthapuram.

Death
He died on 20 February 1916. His mortal remains are interred in the Mateer Memorial CSI Church Cemetery, LMS Compound.

Legacy
The Moses Walsalam Sastriyar Chorus was formed by Mr.Richy Walsalam as a tribute to his contributions to music.

Media

In 2007, a compilation of all the hymns composed and translated by Mosa Walsalam, along with a detailed biography, was published by his Great granddaughter, Saroja Thompson. The publication included an outline of the family line and his descendants, both living and deceased. The eminent Malayalam film writer and director Sohanlal is a Great grandchild of Mosa Walsalam Sastriyar.

See Also (Social reformers of Kerala) 

 Sree Narayana Guru
 Dr. Palpu
 Kumaranasan
 Rao Sahib Dr. Ayyathan Gopalan
 Brahmananda Swami Sivayogi
 Vaghbhatananda
 Mithavaadi Krishnan
 Moorkoth Kumaran
 Ayyankali
 Ayya Vaikundar
 Pandit Karuppan

References
'Moses Walsalam Sastriar', by Saroja Thompson.

External links 
 Mosa Valsalam
 Mosa Valsalam Sasthriyar മോശ വത്സലം ശാസ്ത്രിയാര്‍ - ജീവ ജലംMosa Valsalam Sasthriyar - brief biography in English and Malayalam
 A comprehensive website on the life and music of Swathi Thirunal
 Heralding the spirit of Christmas

1847 births
1916 deaths
Malayalam poets
Indian male composers
19th-century Indian male classical singers
Activists from Kerala
20th-century Indian composers
19th-century Indian composers
Writers from Thiruvananthapuram
Musicians from Thiruvananthapuram
19th-century Indian poets
20th-century Indian poets
Poets from Kerala
Indian social reformers
20th-century Indian male classical singers